Coeloplanidae is a family of comb jellies. It contains two genera.

References

Animal families
Tentaculata